Antonio Schenatti (3 May 1935 – 18 June 2004) was an Italian cross-country skier. He competed in the men's 50 kilometre event at the 1960 Winter Olympics.

References

External links
 

1935 births
2004 deaths
Italian male cross-country skiers
Olympic cross-country skiers of Italy
Cross-country skiers at the 1960 Winter Olympics
People from Sondrio
Sportspeople from the Province of Sondrio